IEEE Transactions on Computers is a monthly peer-reviewed scientific journal covering all aspects of computer design. It was established in 1952 and is published by the IEEE Computer Society. The editor-in-chief is Ahmed Louri, David and Marilyn Karlgaard Endowed Chair Professor of Electrical and Computer Engineering, George Washington University. According to the Journal Citation Reports, the journal has a 2019 impact factor of 3.131.

References

External links 
 

Transactions on Computers
Computer science journals
English-language journals
Publications established in 1952
Monthly journals